Whiptail catfish (Dasyloricaria filamentosa) is a species of armored catfish endemic to Colombia where it is found in the Magdalena River basin and is suspected to also occur in the Catatumbo River.   This species grows to a length of  SL.  D. filamentosa is found in the aquarium trade.

References 
 

filamentosa
Catfish of South America
Freshwater fish of Colombia
Endemic fauna of Colombia
Magdalena River
Taxa named by Franz Steindachner
Fish described in 1878